Three warships of Sweden have been named Vargen, after Vargen:

 , a warship launched in 1716.
 , a warship launched in 1790.
 , a  launched in 1960 and stricken in 1989.

Swedish Navy ship names